Heitor Marinho dos Santos (born 27 April 2000), known as Heitor, is a Brazilian professional footballer who plays as a centre-back for Campeonato Brasileiro Série A club Grêmio.

Club career

Grêmio
Born in Araçatuba, Brazil, Heitor joined the Grêmio's Academy at the age of 17 in 2017.

Career statistics

Club

Honours
Grêmio
Campeonato Gaúcho: 2021, 2022
Recopa Gaúcha: 2021, 2022

References

External links

Profile at the Grêmio F.B.P.A. website

2000 births
Living people
People from Araçatuba
Brazilian footballers
Association football defenders
Grêmio Foot-Ball Porto Alegrense players
Footballers from São Paulo (state)